Joseph or Joe Hewitt may refer to:
 Joseph Hewitt (judge) (1754–1794), English-born Irish barrister, politician and judge
 Sir Joseph Hewitt, 1st Baronet (1865–1923), English solicitor and mine owner
 Joe Hewitt (footballer, born 1881) (1881–1971), English footballer
 Joe Hewitt (baseball) (1885–?), American Negro league baseball player
 Joe Hewitt (RAAF officer) (1901–1985), Royal Australian Air Force officer
 Joe Hewitt (footballer, born 1902) (1902–?), English footballer
 Sir Joseph Hewitt, 2nd Baronet (1907–1973), son of Sir Joseph Hewitt, 1st Baronet, of the Hewitt baronets
 Joe Hewitt (programmer) (born 1978), American computer programmer

See also
Hewitt (disambiguation)